The Vallejo and Northern Railroad was a proposed  interurban line between Vallejo and West Sacramento, California. Terminal sites were purchased in Fairfield, Suisun, Vacaville, and Vallejo, California; but the 1906 San Francisco earthquake temporarily prevented further construction. The company had become a subsidiary of the Sacramento Northern Railway predecessor Northern Electric Railway by the time construction resumed. A single tram lettered Vallejo & Northern # 1 operated in downtown Sacramento from 15 November 1911 until 1914. Construction of what would become the Sacramento Northern Willotta branch began in 1911; and rails were laid in 1913. A steam train operated over track from a dock on Suisun Bay toward Fairfield from February until the line was electrified in June. Northern Electric combination cars numbered 103, 104 and 22 offered passenger service over this isolated branch until passenger service was abandoned in 1926. Motor #701 pulled carloads of freight transferred from barges and shallow-draft steamboats at Suisun. Western Pacific Railroad proposed extending the Willotta branch of their Sacramento Northern subsidiary through Jamison Canyon to connect with the Petaluma and Santa Rosa Railroad (P&SR) as late as 1932, but the Great Depression and Northwestern Pacific Railroad purchase of the P&SR prevented such expansion. The Willotta branch was relocated during construction of Travis Air Force Base in 1942, and diesel locomotives replaced electric operation in 1947.

Sources

Sacramento Northern Railway
Interurban railways in California
Defunct California railroads